Aubrey Hodges is an American composer, musician, multi-instrumentalist and video game music composer. He began his professional audio career in 1985 and has composed music and sound effects for the video game industry since 1991. He has worked on series including Kings Quest, Space Quest, Quest for Glory, PlayStation versions of Doom, Doom 64, and Nintendo 64 versions of Quake and Quake II.

Hodges plays a multitude of instruments, from stringed to brass to percussion, and works in a variety of styles. He also composes and records independent albums under his own name.

Credits

Video games

Aubrey Hodges has contributed to over 200 games, including:

Voice acting

Other work

References

External links

 Aubrey Hodges profile at MobyGames

Living people
Sierra On-Line employees
Video game composers
Year of birth missing (living people)